Evi Christofilopoulou (born 14 April 1956 in Athens) is a Greek politician and Member of the Hellenic Parliament. Between 2013 and January 2015 she has been serving as Deputy Minister of Education, Lifelong learning and Religions in the Greek Ministry of Interior and Administrative Reconstruction.

Early life and education
Evi Christofilopoulou was born in 1956 in Athens, Greece. She graduated from the Law School of the National and Kapodistrian University of Athens.

After her graduation, she entered the London School of Economics where she obtained a Master of Science in Political Science as well as a Ph.D. in Public Administration and Civil Policy.

She is fluent in English and French.

Career

From 1986 until 1991, Evi Christofilopoulou was in charge of the Sector of member Development for the Local Administration in E.E.T.A.A. .

From 1992 until 1997 she co-operated with the National Bank of Greece, as well as enterprises of the private sector in the field of human resources development.

She had also been a Special Consultant of Georgios Gennimatas during his post in the Ministry of Economics.

Academic career
Evi Christofilopoulou has been a Professor in the Department of Public Administration of Engineers and Regional Development of the University of Thessaly, as well as in Post-Doctorate courses of the Department of Political Sciences and Public Administration of the Law School of the National and Kapodistrian University of Athens.

Evi Christofilopoulou, is currently an assistant Professor in the School of Business Administration of the Hellenic Open University.

Politics
Evi Christofilopoulou joined the Panhellenic Socialist Movement in 1999.

From 1997 until 2002, she was the General Secretary of the Administration of Public Funds in charge of the planning and administration of employment and education for Civil Policies.
She has been a member of the Committee of Civil Cases and Research for the Technological Equipment of the Hellenic Parliament.

From 2004 until December 2006, Evi Christofilopoulou was the co-ordinator for Civil Cases in the Parliamentary Team of the Panhellenic Socialist Movement.
She has been a member of the Committee of the program of the Panhellenic Socialist Movement in charge for the policies related to the family and children.

In March 2004, she was elected as a member of the Hellenic Parliament with the Panhellenic Socialist Movement in the Prefecture of Attica (greater Athens).
In October 2009, she was re-elected as a member of the Hellenic Parliament and was appointed as the Deputy Minister of Education, Lifelong learning and Religions in the Cabinet of George Papandreou, which she remained in the Papademos. Following the June 2012 Greek legislative election, she was named spokesperson of the PASOK parliamentary group in the Hellenic Parliament, together with Michalis Chrisochoidis, a position she left on 25 June 2013 after joining the Coalition Cabinet of Antonis Samaras as Deputy Minister of Administrative Reform and e-Governance.

Personal life
Evi Christofilopoulou is married to Dimitris Christofilopoulos. They have a daughter, Eliana, and a son, Paulos.

References
 Biography of Evi Christofilopoulou in the Official Site of the Hellenic Parliament  - 
 Biography of Evi Christofilopoulou

External links
  
 

1956 births
PASOK politicians
Ministers of National Education and Religious Affairs of Greece
Politicians from Athens
Greek MPs 2004–2007
Greek MPs 2007–2009
Greek MPs 2009–2012
Greek MPs 2012 (May)
Greek MPs 2012–2014
Greek MPs 2015 (February–August)
National and Kapodistrian University of Athens alumni
Alumni of the London School of Economics
Academic staff of the National and Kapodistrian University of Athens
Academic staff of the University of Thessaly
Academic staff of Hellenic Open University
Greek political scientists
Living people
Women members of the Hellenic Parliament
Greek MPs 2015–2019
21st-century Greek women politicians
Women government ministers of Greece
Women political scientists